The Dinosaurs is a book published by Bantam Books in 1981.

Contents
The Dinosaurs is a 150-page book edited by Byron Preiss, narrated by William Service, illustrated by William Stout; and introduced by Peter Dodson. The book gives an overview of new theories (at the time) of dinosaur life, including their social groupings, stages of life, travel, food, appearance and physiology. The book includes 70 full-colour plates and many black and white illustrations.

Reviews
In the November 1981 edition of Dragon (Issue #55), Chris Henderson called it "a truly remarkable look at one of mankind's favorite subjects." Henderson especially admired the artwork of William Stout, saying that his "fantastic art" is what makes the book "distinctive and very desirable [...] perhaps the ultimate dinosaur book." Henderson admitted that this was not a deep scholarly work, noting that over half of the book was illustrations. But he called it "an excellent introduction to most of what is known about dinosaurs today."

References

1981 non-fiction books
Bantam Books books
Dinosaur books